Laisha Rosnau (born 1972) is a Canadian novelist and poet.

Biography
Born in Pointe-Claire, Quebec, Rosnau grew up in Vernon, British Columbia. Rosnau received a Master of Fine Arts in Creative Writing from the University of British Columbia, where she was the Executive Editor of PRISM international. Her poetry and short fiction have been published in literary journals and anthologies in Canada, the United States, the United Kingdom and Australia.

Rosnau's first novel, The Sudden Weight of Snow (McClelland and Stewart, 2002), traces a year in the life of a 17-year-old girl living in the interior of British Columbia, and has been praised for its power and grace. It was an honourable mention for the Amazon/Books in Canada First Novel Award.

Rosnau's first collection of poetry, "Notes on Leaving" (Nightwood, 2004) won the 2005 Acorn-Plantos People's Poetry Award. Her second, "Lousy Explorers" (Nightwood, 2009) was a finalist for the Pat Lowther Award for best book of poetry by a Canadian Women. "Pluck" (Nightwood, 2014) takes on issues of sexuality, parenthood, and vulnerability with delicacy and intent, and was nominated for the national Raymond Souster poetry award.

Rosnau's most recent collection of poetry, "Our Familiar Hunger" (Nightwood), "explores sexuality and inequality against the backdrops of historical and contemporary conflict zones, global waves of immigration and expressions of greed and hunger". It has been nominated for the Dorothy Livesay Award. 

Her second novel, Little Fortress, will be published by Wolsak & Wynn in Fall 2019.

As well as full collections of poetry, Rosnau has published two limited edition chapbooks: "Getaway Girl" (Greenboathouse Books, 2002) and "This Glossy Animal" (Baseline Press, 2013).

Rosnau has taught fiction and poetry classes at UBC, Simon Fraser University, Vancouver Film School, and Okanagan College. She was the 2010 Writer in Residence at UBC Okanagan, where she currently teaches in the Creative Studies Department.

Rosnau is married to Aaron Deans and they have two children. The family are the resident caretakers of Bishop Wild Bird Sanctuary in Coldstream, BC.

Bibliography

Poetry
Getaway Girl (2002)
Notes on Leaving (2004)
"Lousy Explorers" (2009)
"This Glossy Animal" (2013)
"Pluck" (2014)
 "Our Familiar Hunger" (2018)

Novels
The Sudden Weight of Snow (2002)

External links
https://www.laisharosnau.com
http://www.nightwoodeditions.com/title/OurFamiliarHunger
Laisha Rosnau at Greenboathouse Books
Laisha Rosnau at McClelland & Stewart
Laisha Rosnau at Anne McDermid & Associates literary agency
http://www.nightwoodeditions.com/title/LousyExplorers
http://www.baselinepress.ca/chapbooks_content.php?subaction=showfull&id=1377473722&archive=&start_from=&ucat=9&
http://www.nightwoodeditions.com/title/Pluck

1972 births
21st-century Canadian novelists
21st-century Canadian poets
Canadian women poets
Canadian women novelists
Living people
People from Pointe-Claire
People from Vernon, British Columbia
People from Coldstream
People from the Okanagan
Canadian women short story writers
21st-century Canadian women writers
21st-century Canadian short story writers